The Pitkin Formation, or Pitkin Limestone, is a fossiliferous geologic formation in northern Arkansas that dates to the Chesterian Series of the late Mississippian. This formation was first named the "Archimedes Limestone" by David Dale Owen in 1858, but was replaced in 1904. The Pitkin conformably overlies the Fayetteville Shale and unconformably underlies the Pennsylvanian-age Hale Formation. Some workers have considered the top of the Pitkin Formation to be a separate formation called the Imo Formation. However more recently, others have considered it as an informal member of the Pitkin Formation.

Paleofauna
Early work aimed at creating a comprehensive list for all fossils found in the Pitkin Formation was done by Easton in 1943. Unless otherwise stated, all species below can be found in his 'Fauna of the Pitkin Formation.'

Formanifera

Archaediscus
A. stilus
Asteroarchaediscus
A. rugosus
Earlandia
Endothyra
E. kleina
E. phrissa
Endothyranella
Eosigmoilina
E. explicata
E. rugosa
Eostaffella
Eotuberitina
Monotaxinoides
Neoarchaediscus
Nodosarchaediscus
Paramillerella
Planospirodiscus
Plectogyra
Priscella
Pseudoammodiscus
P. priscus
Pseudoglomospira
Tetrataxis
T. corona
Trepeilopsis
Zellerina
Z. designata
Z. discoidea

Porifera, Sponges

Cliona

Scyphozoa
Conularia Originally considered to be a gastropod.

Anthozoa, Corals

Amplexus
Aulopora
A. gracilis
Caninostrotion
C. variablilis
Kinkaidia
Lesliella
Leonardophyllum
Lonsdaleia
L. major
L. minor
Michellinia
M. macerimuris
Parvaxon
Pleurodictyum
P. eugenei
P. meekanum
Syringopora
Triplophyllum

Blastoidea

Pentremites
P. elongatus
P. godoni
P. laminatus
P. obesus
P. platybasis

Crinoidea, Sea Lilies

Agassizocrinus (see unidentified section)
A. patulus 
Aphelecrinus
A. planus
Bronaughocrinus
B. figuratus
Camptocrinus
Carinocrinus
C. stevensi
Castillocrinus
Catillocrinus
Cosmetocrinus
C. eventus
Cromyocrinus
Culmicrinus
Cyathocrinus
Delocrinus
Dichocrinus
Hydreionocrinus
Linocrinus
L. floweri
Onychocrinus
O. pulaskiensis
Pachylocrinus
Paianocrinus
P. aptus
P. durus
Paracymbiocrinus
P. pitkini
Pelecocrinus
P. stereostoma
Pentaramicrinus
P. modulus
Phacelocrinus
Phanocrinus
P. cooksoni
P. irregularis
Poteriocrinus
Pterotocrinus
P. tridecibrachiatus
Scytalocrinus (see unidentified section)
S. braggsi
S. dunlapi
S. garfieldi
Taxocrinus
T. whitfieldi
Telikosocrinus
T. caespes
T. residuus
Zeusocrinus
Z. foveatus

Ophiuroidea, Brittle Stars
This group was originally place under Stelleroidia in early studies.
Aganaster
A. singulatus
Schoenaster

Echinoidea, Sea Urchins

Archaeocidaris

Worms
Previous studies have grouped these diverse animals into a single, obsolete taxon: Vermes.
Spirorbis

Bryozoa, "Moss-animals"

Anisotrypa
A. solida 
Archimedes (called Archimedipora in early studies)
A. communis 
A. compactoides 
A. compactus 
A. distans 
A. fosteri 
A. fragilis 
A. intermedia (A. intermedius) 
A. invaginata (A. invaginatus) 
A. lunatus 
A. magnus 
A. meekanus 
A. moorei 
A. pitkinensis 
A. proutana (A. proutanus) 
A. sublaxus 
A. swallovana (A. swallovanus) 
A. terebriformis 
Batostomella 
Chellotrypa
C. distans 
Chilotrypa
C. regularis 
Dichotrypa
D. levis 
Dyscritella 
Fenestella 
F. cumingsi 
F. matheri 
F. rectangularis 
F. serratula 
F. tenax 
Fistulipora
F. introspinosa 
Glyptopora
G. crassa 
G. michilinia 
Lyropora
L. solida 
Meekopora
M. abrupta 
M. tenuis 
Polypora
P. whitei 
Rhombopora 
Septopora
S. biserialis 
S. cestriensis 
S. subquadrans 
Tabulopora
T. cestriensis  
T. microfistulata 
T. poculoformis 
T refiexa 
T. subtilis

Brachiopoda

Adectorhynchus
A. suspectum 
Athyris 
A. cestriensis 
Buxtonia 
B. arkansana 
Camarophoria
C. cestriensis 
C explanata 
Chonetes
C. oklahomensis
C. sericeus
C. tumescens
Cliothyridina 
C. sublamellosa 
Composita (See unidentified section)
C. subquadrata 
C. trinuclea
Crania 
C. infimbriata
Diaphragmus
Dielasma 
D. arkansanum 
D. formosum 
D. illinoisensis
D. shumardanum 
D. whitfieldi 
Echinoconchus (See unidentified section) 
E. alternatus 
Eumetria 
E. costata 
E. pitkinensis 
E. vera 
Girtyella 
G. indianensis
Hustedia 
H. multicostata 
Krotavia
K. lucerna
Lingula 
Lingulidiscina
L. newberryi var. moorefieldana and ovata 
Linoproductus 
L. pileiformis 
Martinia 
Orthotetes 
O. kaskaskiensis
O. stenopsis
O. subglobosus (var. protensa) 
O. uspectum 
Productus
P. cestriensis 
P. fasciculatus
Pustula 
Reticularia 
R. setigera 
Spirifer 
S. leidyi 
S. pellaensis 
Spiriferina 
S. spinosa 
Streptorhynchus 
Syringothyris 
S. aequalis
Tetracamera 
T. neogenes

Bivalvia, Bivalves
This group was also referred to by another name in earlier studies: Pelecypoda.

Allorisma 
A. walkeri 
Astartella 
Aviculopecten 
A. batesvillensis 
A. eurekensis 
A. keoughensis 
A. morrowensis 
A. multilineatus 
A. pitkinensis 
Conocardium 
C. peculiare
Cypricardella (See unidentified section)
Edmondia 
E. crassa (Along with E. crassa var. suborbiculoidea) 
E. pitkinensis 
Leda 
L. vaseyana 
Leiopteria 
Leptodesma
Myalina 
M. compressa 
M. longicardinalis 
Nucula 
N. illinoisensis 
Parallelodon 
Pteronites
Schizodus (See unidentified section)
S. arkansanus 
S. chesterensis 
S. depressus 
S. insignis
Solenomya 
Sphenotus 
S. cherokeense 
S. gibsonense 
S. quadriplicatum

Scaphopoda, Tusk Shells
Laevidentalium

Gastropoda, Snails

Bellerophon (See unidentified section)
B. pitkinensis
Bucanella
Colpites
Euphemites 
E. incarinatus
Clabrocingulum
Gosseletina (See unidentified section)
Helcionopsis
H. reticulatus
Hemizyga 
Holopea 
H. newtonensis
Latischisma
Leptoptygma (See unidentified section)
Microptychis
Mourlonia 
M. angulata
Naticopsis 
Neilsonia
Phanerotremas 
Platyceras
P. subrotundum
Pseudozygopleura
Sphaerodoma 
S. subcorpulenta 
Stegocoelia
Straparolus
S. planidorsatus 
S. triliris
Strobeus (See unidentified section)
Strophostylus

Cephalopoda

Arcanoceras
A. furnishi
Coloceras (see unidentified section)
Cravenoceras 
C. hesperium 
C. richardsonianum
Cycloceras 
C. randolphensis
C. equoyahensis
Dolorthoceras (See unidentified section)
D. eurekensis
Eoasianites
E. globosus
Eumorphoceras
E. bisulcatum
Metadimorphoceras
Mooreoceras
Syngastrioceras
Trizonoceras

Trilobita
Grifithides
G. pustulosus
Kaskia
K. chesterensis
K. pitkinensis
Paladin 
P. mucronatus

Ostracoda
Glyptopleurain
G. optina 
Paraparchites 
Primitia
P. fayettevillensis

Vertebrata
Cladodus
Deltodus
Petalodus

Plantae, Plants
"Encrusting Algae" has been reported but not assigned to any genus.
Archaeolithophyllum
Asphaltina
A. cordillerensis
Girvanella
Rectangulina

Unidentified
Following is a list of fossils also found in the Pitkin by Easton in 1943 that have gone unidentified.
 A "Cup Coral" 
 A member of the genus Pentremites
 Three species within Agassizocrinus
 Two species within Scytalocrinus
 A totally unidentifiable Crinoid
 Two species of Bellerophon
 Two species of Gosseletina
 Two species of Leptoptygma
 Two Species of Strobeus
 One species each of Composita and Echinoconchus
 Two species of Cypricardella
 Two species of Coloceras, one of which may actually be Leuroceras
 One species of Dolorthoceras
 An unnamed shark spine

See also

 List of fossiliferous stratigraphic units in Arkansas
 Paleontology in Arkansas

References

Carboniferous Arkansas
Carboniferous geology of Oklahoma
Carboniferous southern paleotropical deposits